In India, the Telugu year is the calendar year for the Telugu  speaking people of Andhra Pradesh and Telangana states.

Each Yuga (Era) has a cycle of 60 years. Each year of Ugadi year has a specific name in Panchangam (Astronomical calendar) based on astrological influences and the name of the year would represent the character of that year. The calendar includes 60 year names. Every 60 years one name cycle completes and the names repeat in the next cycle. For example, the Telugu name for 1954 is "jaya", repeated in 2014. Ugadi is the Telugu new year festival that comes in the spring season (usually March or April). These years always change on Ugadi.

The year 2023 is a Subhakritu year.

Years
The five Ugadi year names are as follows:

  (1867, 1927, 1987, 2047) Prabhava  ప్రభవ
  (1868, 1928, 1988, 2048) Vibhava విభవ
  (1869, 1929, 1989, 2049) Sukla శుక్ల
  (1870, 1930, 1990, 2050) Pramodyuta ప్రమోదూత
  (1871, 1931, 1991, 2051) Prajothpatti ప్రజోత్పత్తి
  (1872, 1932, 1992, 2052) Aangeerasa ఆంగీరస
  (1873, 1933, 1993, 2053) Sreemukha శ్రీముఖ
  (1874, 1934, 1994, 2054) Bhāva భవ
  (1875, 1935, 1995, 2055) Yuva యువ
  (1876, 1936, 1996, 2056) Dhāta ధాత
  (1877, 1937, 1997, 2057) Īswara ఈశ్వర
  (1878, 1938, 1998, 2058) Bahudhānya బహుధాన్య 
  (1879, 1939, 1999, 2059) Pramādhi ప్రమాధి
  (1880, 1940, 2000, 2060) Vikrama విక్రమ
  (1881, 1941, 2001, 2061) Vrisha వృష 
  (1882, 1942, 2002, 2062) Chitrabhānu చిత్రభాను 
  (1883, 1943, 2003, 2063) Svabhānu స్వభాను
  (1884, 1944, 2004, 2064) Tārana తారణ
  (1885, 1945, 2005, 2065) Pārthiva పార్థివ
  (1886, 1946, 2006, 2066) Vyaya వ్యయ 
  (1887, 1947, 2007, 2067) Sarvajiththu సర్వజిత్తు
  (1888, 1948, 2008, 2068) Sarvadhāri సర్వధారి 
  (1889, 1949, 2009, 2069) Virodhi విరోధి 
  (1890, 1950, 2010, 2070) Vikruti వికృతి 
  (1891, 1951, 2011, 2071) Khara ఖర 
  (1892, 1952, 2012, 2072) Nandana ‌నందన
  (1893, 1953, 2013, 2073) Vijaya విజయ 
  (1894, 1954, 2014, 2074) Jaya జయ 
  (1895, 1955, 2015, 2075) Manmadha మన్మధ  
  (1896, 1956, 2016, 2076) Durmukhi దుర్ముఖి 
  (1897, 1957, 2017, 2077) Hevalambi హేవళంబి
  (1898, 1958, 2018, 2078) Vilambi విళంబి
  (1899, 1959, 2019, 2079) Vikāri వికారి (అనారోగ్యము కలిగించునది)
  (1900, 1960, 2020, 2080) Sārvari శార్వరి (చీకటి)
  (1901, 1961, 2021, 2081) Plava ప్లవ (ఒడ్డుకు చేర్చునది)
  (1902, 1962, 2022, 2082) Subhakritu శుభకృతు (శుభములు కలిగించేది)
  (1903, 1963, 2023, 2083) Sobhakritu శోభకృతు (లాభములు కలిగించేది)
  (1904, 1964, 2024, 2084) Krodhi క్రోధి (కోపం కలిగించేది)
  (1905, 1965, 2025, 2085) Viswāvasu విశ్వావసు
  (1906, 1966, 2026, 2086) Parābhava పరాభవ (vu)
  (1907, 1967, 2027, 2087) Plavanga ప్లవంగ
  (1908, 1968, 2028, 2088) Kīlaka కీలక 
  (1909, 1969, 2029, 2089) Soumya సౌమ్య 
  (1910, 1970, 2030, 2090) Sādhārana సాధారణ 
  (1911, 1971, 2031, 2091) Virodhikritu విరోధికృతు 
  (1912, 1972, 2032, 2092) Paridhāvi పరిధావి
  (1913, 1973, 2033, 2093) Pramādeecha ప్రమాదీచ
  (1914, 1974, 2034, 2094) Ānanda ఆనంద
  (1915, 1975, 2035, 2095) Rākshasa రాక్షస
  (1916, 1976, 2036, 2096) Nala నల
  (1917, 1977, 2037, 2097) Pingala పింగళ
  (1918, 1978, 2038, 2098) Kālayukti కాళయుక్తి
  (1919, 1979, 2039, 2099) Siddhārthi సిద్ధార్ది
  (1920, 1980, 2040, 2100) Roudri రౌద్రి
  (1921, 1981, 2041, 2101) Durmathi దుర్మతి
  (1922, 1982, 2042, 2102) Dundubhi దుందుభి
  (1923, 1983, 2043, 2103) Rudhirodgāri రుధిరోద్గారి
  (1924, 1984, 2044, 2104) Raktākshi రక్తాక్షి
  (1925, 1985, 2045, 2105) Krodhana క్రోధన
  (1926, 1986, 2046, 2106) Akshya అక్షయ

Significance

In ancient days Yogis (saints) interact directly with god, according to that, they have given information related to our Indian Kalachakra (time-cycle) in relation to Lord Brahma. Below is the Indian Kalachakra (time-cycle):

60 years            = Shashti Poorthi

432,000 years       = Kali Yuga

864,000 years       = Dvapara Yuga

1,296,000 years     = Treta Yuga

1,728,000 years     = Satya Yuga

4,320,000 years     = Chatur Yuga (Total 4 Yuga)

71 Chatur Yuga      = Manvantara

1,000 Chatur Yuga   = Kalpa  Brahma day (= 14 Manvantara + 15 Manvantara-sandhya)

Kalpa + Pralaya = Brahma Day (day + night)

30 Brahma Days      = Brahma month

12 Brahma months    = Brahma year

100 Brahma years    = Brahma lifespan  Maha-kalpa of 311.04 trillion years (followed by Maha-pralaya of equal length)

References 

Calendars
Telugu language
Names of units of time